The False Inspector Dew is a humorous crime novel by Peter Lovesey. It won the Gold Dagger award by the Crime Writers' Association in 1982 and has featured on many "Best of" lists since.

Plot introduction
It is 1921, and Alma Webster, a reader of romances, is passionately in love with her dentist, Walter Baranov. There is only one foreseeable outcome: the murder of his wife. Inspired by the real-life Dr Crippen case, they plot the perfect murder while aboard the ocean liner Mauretania. The dentist takes on the identity of Inspector Walter Dew, Crippen’s nemesis, but when a murder occurs aboard the ship the captain invites "Inspector Dew" to investigate.

Literary significance and reception
The novel is highly praised by many crime fiction critics and writers. Julian Symons in his book Bloody Murder referred to it as “one of the cleverest crime comedies of the past few years.” Famous crime writer Ruth Rendell said in a review: “A masterpiece. I defy anyone to foresee the outcome.”

Awards
CWA Gold Dagger Award, 1982
Listed in Crime & Mystery: the 100 Best Books
Listed in Hatchards 100 Top Crime Novels
Listed in The Times 100 Best Crime Novels of the Twentieth Century
Dagger of Daggers shortlist, 2006

Publication history
1982, UK, London, Macmillan, Hardback
1982, USA, Pantheon, Hardback
1983, UK, Arrow Books, Paperback
1983, USA, Pantheon, Paperback

1982 British novels
British crime novels
Fiction set in 1921
Macmillan Publishers books
Novels set on ships